Itakura is a Japanese surname. Notable people with the surname include:

, Japanese daimyō
, Japanese daimyō
, Japanese daimyō
, Japanese daimyō
, Japanese daimyō
, Japanese daimyō
, Japanese daimyō
, Japanese jazz pianist
, Japanese daimyō
, Japanese molecular biologist
, Japanese footballer
, Japanese racewalker
, Japanese sport shooter
, Japanese ten-pin bowler
, Japanese daimyō
, Japanese daimyō
, Japanese daimyō
, Japanese military historian

Japanese-language surnames